Dear Senthuran: A Black Spirit Memoir is a 2021 memoir written by Nigerian author Akwaeke Emezi. It was first published in 2021 by Riverhead Books in the United States and Faber and Faber in the United Kingdom.

References 

Nigerian non-fiction books
2021 non-fiction books
Riverhead Books books
Faber and Faber books